Myriopus is a genus of flowering plants in the borage and forget-me-not family Boraginaceae (or Heliotropiaceae), native to Latin America, the Caribbean, and Florida.

Species
Currently accepted species include:
 
Myriopus breviflorus (A.DC.) Luebert
Myriopus candidulus (Miers) Feuillet
Myriopus gardnerianus (A.DC.) J.I.M.Melo
Myriopus maculatus (Jacq.) Feuillet
Myriopus membranaceus (A.DC.) J.I.M.Melo
Myriopus microphyllus (Bertero ex Spreng.) Feuillet
Myriopus paniculatus (Cham.) Feuillet
Myriopus parvifolius (Alain) Feuillet
Myriopus petionvillae (Urb. & Ekman) Feuillet
Myriopus poliochros (Spreng.) Small
Myriopus psilostachya (Kunth) Diane & Hilger
Myriopus rubicundus (Salzm. ex DC.) Luebert
Myriopus salicifolius (Gardner) J.I.M.Melo
Myriopus salzmannii (A.DC.) Diane & Hilger
Myriopus stenophyllus (Urb.) Feuillet
Myriopus suffruticosus (L.) Feuillet
Myriopus volubilis (L.) Small

References

Boraginaceae
Boraginaceae genera